Ara Babloyan (Armenian:Արա Բաբլոյան; born 5 May 1947) is an Armenian doctor pediatrician and politician, and the former President of the National Assembly of Armenia.

Career 
1971 – M. Heratsi Yerevan State Medical University, Department of Pediatrics, M.D.

1971–1998 – Residency, postgraduate and professional development courses on pediatric surgery and kidney and liver transplantation in Russia, Belgium, Switzerland and France. Post doctorate degree in medicine, professor.

2003–2005 – Member of the Standing Committee of the European Regional Committee of the World Health Organization (WHO).

2008–2012 – Member of the WHO Executive Committee.

2007–2015 – Chairman of the Armenian Association of Pediatricians, and a member of the European Society of Pediatric Urology, the Swiss Society of Nephrology. A member of the Belgian Royal Academy of Medicine.

Chief Pediatric Surgeon of the Ministry of Health of Armenia.

1970–1971 – Outpatient clinic No. 8, Urology Division, assistant physician, physician.

1971–1972 – Outpatient clinic No. 8, pediatric surgeon and urologist.

1972–1982 – Children's clinical hospital No. 1, pediatric surgeon and urologist.

1982–1990 – Yerevan Children's Clinical Hospital No. 3, Head of the Urology Department.

1990 – Founder of the "Specialized Center of Urology, Nephrology and Pediatric Surgery.”

1977–1997 – Yerevan State Medical University (YSMU), Faculty of Pediatric Surgery, senior lecturer and professor.

1991–1997 – Minister of Health of the Republic Armenia.

1997 – Yerevan State Medical University, Chair of pediatric surgery.

1997–2002 – "Arabkir" Children's Clinical Centre, General Director.

1999–2007 – United Children Charitable Fund, Executive Director.

2003–2007 – "Arabkir" Joint Institute and Medical Center of Child and Adolescent Health, Chairperson of the Management Board.

2007 – "Arabkir" Joint Institute and Medical Center of Child and Adolescent Health, Scientific Director.

2007–2012 – Member of the National Assembly of Armenia, Republican Party of Armenia.

Chair of the Standing Committee on Health Care, Maternity and Childhood of the National Assembly. Member of the "Republican" faction (RPA), non-partisan.

2012–2017 – Member of the National Assembly of Armenia, Republican Party of Armenia.

Chair of the Standing Committee on Health Care, Maternity and Childhood of the National Assembly. Member of the "Republican" faction (RPA). Member of the RPA Board.

2 April 2017 – Member of the National Assembly of Armenia, the RPA party list.

On 18 May 2017 elected as the President of the National Assembly of Armenia.

Criminal prosecution 
In October 2019, Ara Babloyan was under criminal prosecution as a suspect of assisting the seizure of the powers of the Constitutional Court of Armenia and committing official forgery. Later, Babloyan has been charged with assisting the seizure of the powers of the Constitutional Court of Armenia and committing official forgery and the criminal case with the indictment has been sent to the prosecutor supervising the case for the approval of the indictment. The prosecutor did not approve the indictment of the case and has sent it back to the investigative authorities (the Special Investigation Service) for further and additional investigation.

Honours 
Ara Babloyan was honored with several awards.

2005 – Gold Medal by the Ministry of Education and Science of Armenia on the occasion of the 75th anniversary of Yerevan State Medical University. 

2005 – "Officier de l'Ordre National Du Merite" Medal for the development of professional cooperation and Armenian – French relations by Jacques Chirac, the President of French Republic. 

2007 – "Mkhitar Heratsi" Medal. 

2012 – the Jubilee Medal of the "Armed Forces of Armenia: 20 Years" by the decree of the Defense Minister of Armenia. 

2013 – the Nagorno-Karabakh Republic’s "Gratitude" Medal. 

2014 – the Medals of Honor, "Saint Sahak – Saint Mesrop" by Catholicos Karekin II, the Supreme Patriarch of all Armenians. 

2015 – the President of Armenia Award for scientific achievements in the field of medicine. 

2016 – Second rank Order of Services to Motherland.

References

1947 births
Living people
Presidents of the National Assembly (Armenia)
Members of the National Assembly (Armenia)
Politicians from Yerevan
Armenian pediatricians
Yerevan State Medical University alumni
Republican Party of Armenia politicians
Physicians from Yerevan